Acarnus erithacus is a species of sponge of the genus Acarnus. It was described by de Laubenfels in 1927.

References

Poecilosclerida
Species described in 1927